Highland dance or Highland dancing is a style of competitive dancing developed in the Scottish Highlands in the 19th and 20th centuries, in the context of competitions at public events such as the Highland games. It was created from the Gaelic folk dance repertoire, but formalised with the conventions of ballet, and has been subject to influences from outside the Highlands. Highland dancing is often performed with the accompaniment of Highland bagpipe music, and dancers wear specialised shoes called ghillies. It is now seen at nearly every modern-day Highland games event.

Highland dance should not be confused with Scottish country dance, cèilidh dancing, or clog dancing, although they too may be performed at Highland games and like competitions.

Basic description of Highland dancing

Highland dancing is a competitive and technical dance form requiring technique, stamina, and strength, and is recognised as a sport by the Sport Council of Scotland.

In Highland dancing, the dancers dance on the balls of the feet.  Highland dancing is a form of solo step dancing, from which it evolved, but while some forms of step dancing are purely percussive in nature, Highland dancing involves not only a combination of steps but also some integral upper body, arm, and hand movements.

Highland dancing should not be confused with Scottish country dancing which is both a social dance (that is, a dance which is danced with a partner or partners) like ballroom dancing, and a formation dance (that is, a dance in which an important element is the pattern of group movement about the dance floor) like square dancing.

Some Highland dances do derive from traditional social dances. An example is the Highland Reel, also known as the Foursome Reel, in which groups of four dancers alternate between solo steps facing one another and a figure-of-eight style with intertwining progressive movement. Even so, in competitions, the Highland Reel dancers are judged individually. Most Highland dances are danced solo.

Scottish and Irish dancing

Many non-practitioners think the two Celtic forms are synonymous.  While some dance studios teach both, they are two distinct styles, not just in the attire.  In comparison to Scottish highland dance, Irish dancers rarely use their arms which are held beside their bodies (rather than raised above the shoulders), legs and feet are frequently crossed (not turned out at 45°), and frequent use of the hard-soled step shoes (compared to ghillies or 'pumps').  There is a greater use of choreography than traditional movements.

History

Modern Highland dancing emerged in the 19th and 20th centuries. It was 'created from the Gaelic folk dance repertoire, but formalised with the conventions of ballet'.

It seems that forms of sword dancing were performed by warriors in many parts of Europe in the prehistoric period. Forms of sword dancing are also attested in the late Medieval period. Ritualistic and combative dances that imitated epic deeds and martial skills were a familiar feature in Scottish tradition and folklore. The earliest reference to these dances in Scotland is mentioned in the Scotichronicon which was compiled in Scotland by Walter Bower in the 1440s. The passage regards Alexander III and his second marriage to the French noblewoman Yolande de Dreux at Jedburgh on 14 October 1285. 
At the head of this procession were the skilled musicians with many sorts of pipe music including the music of bagpipes, and behind them others splendidly performing a war-dance with intricate weaving in and out. Bringing up the rear was a figure regarding whom it was difficult to decide whether it was a man or an apparition. It seemed to glide like a ghost rather than walk on feet. When it looked as if he was disappearing from everyone's sight, the whole frenzied procession halted, the song died away, the music faded, and the dancing contingent froze suddenly and unexpectedly.

In 1573 Scottish mercenaries are said to have performed a Scottish sword dance before the Swedish King, John III, at a banquet held in Stockholm Castle. The dance, 'a natural feature of the festivities', was used as part of a plot to assassinate the King, where the conspirators were able to bare their weapons without arising suspicion. Fortunately for the King, at the decisive moment the agreed signal was never given.

Sword dances and highland dances were included at a reception for Anne of Denmark at Edinburgh in May 1590, and a mixture of sword dance and acrobatics was performed before James VI in 1617, and again for Charles I in 1633, by the Incorporation of Skinners and Glovers of Perth, 
his Majesty's chair being set upon the wall next to the Water of Tay whereupon was a floating stage of timber clad about with birks, upon the which for his Majesty's welcome and entry thirteen of our brethren of this calling of Glovers with green caps, silver strings, red ribbons, white shoes and bells upon their legs, shearing rapiers in their hands and all other abulzements, danced our sword dance with many difficult knots and allapallajesse, five being under and five above upon their shoulders, three of them dancing through their feet and about them, drinking wine and breaking glasses. Which (God be praised) was acted and done without hurt or skaith to any.

The British central government's policy of cultural suppression against Highland culture culminated in 1747 when the Act of Proscription, which forbade the wearing of kilts by civilian males, went into effect. The Act was repealed in 1782 and in the early 19th century, there was something of a romanticisation of Highland culture (or such as it was imagined to be). This revival, later boosted greatly by Queen Victoria's enthusiasm for it, included the beginnings of the Highland games as we now know them. Highland dancing was an integral part of the Games from the very start of their modern revival, but the selection of dances performed at Games was intentionally narrowed down, mostly for the convenience of judges. Therefore, while the tradition of Highland games seemed at first glance to have fostered and preserved Highland dancing, many older dances got lost because nobody considered them worthwhile to practice, as they were not required for competition. The nature of these displays and competitions also affected the style of the dancing itself.

Organisations

Most dancing prior to the 1900s was not organised at a national or international level.  Judges of competitions were local persons, without specific standards for attire or the steps to the danced.  Local Caledonian societies trained young dancers in the way of each society.  Slowly consistency of steps was achieved, and dancing-specific organisations were established.

Dancers now undergo written examinations and practical assessments to become a teacher, and then further training and testing to become a dancer examiner, then competition judge or adjudicator.

Royal Scottish Official Board of Highland Dancing (RSOBHD)

Many if not most Highland gatherings worldwide recognise the Royal Scottish Official Board of Highland Dancing (RSOBHD), formed in 1950, as the world governing body of Highland dancing.  The 'Royal' title from the Queen of the United Kingdom was approved by 16 November 2019.  The RSOBHD standardised dance steps for competition purposes, established rules for competitions and attire, and certifies competitions and instructors. The RSOBHD World Highland Dance Championship has been held annually at the Cowal Highland Gathering since 1934.  Today this RSOBHD World Championship is sanctioned by the RSOBHD at three levels: Juvenile, Junior and Adult. Only SOBHD-registered dancers may compete at this RSOBHD championship.

The RSOBHD is made up of representatives from many different Highland Dancing bodies and associations from around the world. The Board comprises delegates from the examining bodies (professional teaching associations), affiliated organisations in Australia (Australian Board of Highland Dancing Inc.), Canada (ScotDance Canada), South Africa (Official Board of Highland Dancing (South Africa)), New Zealand (Scot Dance New Zealand), and the United States (Federation of United States Teachers and Adjudicators) which represent the many Highland dance organisations in those countries.

The RSOBHD board sanctions Highland dancing championships although does not actually organise any of them.  There are non-RSOBHD sanctioned championships run by non-RSOBHD aligned organisations at which registered RSOBHD dancers are forbidden to take part by the RSOBHD. At competitions and championships run by non-RSOBHD organisations, all dancers are welcome, however if they choose to participate they may receive a ban from the RSOBHD. Similarly, dancers not registered with the RSOBHD are forbidden to dance at RSOBHD sanctioned competitions by the RSOBHD. Each year the RSOBHD selects the championship steps to be performed by dancers at championships around the world. An official RSOBHD Highland Dance technique book for dancers and teachers has been published.

Other dancing bodies

Other organisations that qualify Highland dancers, teachers, and judges and hold competitions include: 
 the Scottish Official Highland Dancing Association (SOHDA)
 the New Zealand Academy of Highland and National Dancing
 the Victorian Scottish Union (Australia).

Such organisations provide a wide syllabus of Highland and national dances and steps within their teaching.

Highland games and competitions

At Highland games, the Highland dances were at first danced only by men. Women would take part in social dances, and girls did learn solo dances as part of their general dance classes. In fact, dancing masters would often encourage their most promising students (male or female) to perform solo dances at their end-of-term 'assemblies'.

In the late 19th century a young woman named Jenny Douglas (the name of Lorna Mitchell is also suggested) decided to enter a Highland dance competition. As this was not expressly forbidden, she was allowed to enter. Since then the number of females participating in the sport has increased until today in excess of 95% of all dancers are female. There have been several female World Champions crowned at the Cowal Highland Gathering since they began organising the competition in 1948. The first international competitor to win the Adult World Championship was Flora Stuart Grubb of Australia (1960) with Hugh Bigney being the first American to win the title in 1973.  Indeed, the first three Adult World Championships were won by ladies: May Falconer, Motherwell (1948), Margaret Samson, Stirling (1949 and 1950).  This feminisation of folk arts is a common pattern in the process of their 'gentrification', especially after they no longer serve a functional role in a male-centred, warrior culture.  Males are still well represented at the world championships.

Highland dancing competitions may be held solely or as part of larger events.  The small annual Scottish Glen Isla competition is almost inconspicuous on the roadside, and is beside piping events and some heavy game events.  Canada's Glengarry Highland Games on the other hand is one of the largest dancing and piping events on the North American calendar.  Many of Australia's competitions are held indoors as a solo activity, while Canadian and Scottish competitions are associated with Highland games with a nearby hall available in case of inclement weather.

As far as competitions were concerned, until the early 20th century the usual dances seen were the Sword Dance, the Seann Triubhas, the Strathspey and Highland Reel, the Reel of Tulloch, and the Highland Fling. Since then, various other (pre-existing) dances have been added to the competition repertoire. For example, two character dances, 'The sailor's hornpipe' and 'The Irish jig' gained popularity in music hall and vaudeville productions.

Judging

Most judges today evaluate a dancer on three major criteria: timing, technique and interpretation/overall deportment.

Timing concerns the ability of the dancer to follow the rhythm of the music.
Technique has to do with the correct execution of the steps in coordination with the movements of the rest of the body, including head, arm and hand movements.
Artistic interpretation covers that essential element of all dance and artistry in general which cannot be quantified or reduced to any set of rules or specific points, but which does concern the ability of the dancer or performer to convey a sense of feeling, understanding, and appreciation of the art form.
 The ability of the dancer including the jumping height and the confidence.

The various governing bodies of Highland dancing establish parameters for the dances themselves and scoring systems to grade the dancers and determine their class and progress from one class to another.  The scoring system for these competitions begins with each dancer starting with 100 points. For any mistakes, poor execution, etc., results in subtraction of points at the judges discretion. The dancers are then ranked from most to fewest points, and medals and points are given based on the number of dancers in the class.

The notion of how dances were to be executed changed dramatically over the years. For instance, doing an early-20th-century-style sword dance in a competition today would get a dancer disqualified nearly immediately.  There used to be terrible confusion as to what would be allowed (or prescribed) where, until the RSOBHD came up with a standard that has become acceptable to the majority of competitive dancers.

Types of dances

Scottish highland dances are generally divided into several types.  Categories are more for convenience than strict style:

 Highland dances (such as the Highland fling and sword dance)
 national dances (such as the Scottish lilt, Flora McDonald's fancy)
 character dances (such as the sailor's hornpipe, Irish jig, and the cakewalk)

Step dancing and clog dancing also used to regularly be part of some competitions.

Steps of each dance are now laid out in national and international syllabus such as the text books of the RSOBHD, United Kingdom Alliance Ltd (UKA), and British Association of Teachers of Dancing (BATD).  Each dance comprises a number of steps, which may be numbered or worded.  A RSOBHD four-step Highland fling may have the 1st step, 7th, 5th alternative, and finish with the 8th step; or by the step name: Shedding, Double shake and rock, Second back-stepping, and Last shedding.

Highland dances

The Highlander developed 'as a necessary preparation for the management of the broad-sword... used in certain dances to exhibit their dexterity'; this included dancing over two naked swords which are laid across each other on the floor, some while a dancer moves nimbly around them. Dextrously placing the feet by a peculiar step in the intervals between crossed blades, as in the Ghillie Callum, has long been linked with dances before a decisive battle or as a victory dance. Legend has it that on the eve of battle the highland chief would call out the clan's best dancers, who would dance the sword dance. If the dancers successfully avoided touching either blade, then it was considered an omen that the next day's battle would be in the clan's favour. A more practical explanation behind the meaning of this dance can be found in the training halls of older styles of fencing, where students of the sword developed their footwork by following geometric patterns of crosses, squares and triangles marked out on the floor.

In another version of Scottish sword dancing, the Highlander danced on a targe shield, this has similarities with an ancient Roman exercise in which the man standing on a shield had to defend himself and stay upright while others tried to pull it out from under him. Many of the Highland dances now lost to us were once performed with traditional weapons that included the Lochaber axe, the broadsword, targe and dirk and the flail, the old Skye dancing song, 'Buailidh mi thu anns a' cheann' (I will strike your head) indicate some form of weapon play to music, 'breaking the head' was the winning blow in cudgelling matches throughout Britain, 'for the moment that blood runs an inch anywhere above the eyebrow, the old gamester to whom it belongs is beaten, and has to stop'.

The Highland Dirk Dance, in which the dancer flourishes the weapon, is often linked to the sword dance or dances called 'Mac an Fhorsair', (literally, 'the son of the Forester'), the 'Broad Sword Exercise' or the 'Bruicheath' (battle dance). They are mentioned in a number of sources, usually military, and may have been performed in a variety of different forms, practiced by two performers in a duelling form, or as a solo routine.

The tune of Gille Chaluim (anglicised as 'Gillie Callum' and meaning 'the servant of Calum' in Gaelic) has been claimed to date back to Malcolm III of Scotland (1031–1093) but this claim is certain to have been fabricated to provide false credentials for the antiquity of the dance which is unlikely to have been invented before 1800. According to one tradition, the crossed swords were supposedly placed on the ground before a battle while a soldier danced around the blades. If his feet knocked against the swords, he would be wounded in battle. This may derive from the folklore often surrounding warrior culture, but the style of the dance was changed by the Maclennan brothers of Fairburn.

One theory about the Highland Fling is that it was a dance of triumph at the end of a battle. Another (no less romantic) theory is that it was performed before battles (like the sword dance), on top of the dancer's shield. The shield would have a spike in the middle, around which the dancer would do the dance that involves flicking of the feet, jumping and careful stepping supposedly to drive evil spirits away. The dancer is confined to one spot and snaps his fingers (which was reduced in recent times to merely holding the hands with the thumb touching the second joint of the middle finger, and the other three fingers extended in the air). Leaving aside the obvious difficulty of dancing around a sharpened spike on a shield, a much more plausible theory is that the Highland Fling is none other than a Foursome Reel with the progressive bits left out - at social gatherings, dancers would 'compete' by showing off the fancy solo steps they could perform, long before formal competitions at highland games had been invented.

Another story surrounding the Fling claims that it is meant to imitate a stag; the story goes that a boy who saw a stag was asked to describe it by his father. He lacked the words, so danced instead; the position of the hands resembles the head and antlers of a stag. This urban legend hides the fact that Highlanders used to snap their fingers as they danced.

Ruidhle Thulaichean (anglicised as 'The Reel of Tulloch') is supposed to have originated in the churchyard of Tullich, Aberdeenshire, where the congregation awaited the late minister. During the delay they whistled a highland tune and began to improvise a dance.   A more gruesome version of the story is that the dance derives from a rough game of football that the inhabitants of Tulloch played with the severed head of an enemy; the Gaelic words to the tune bear this out.

The Seann Triubhas means 'old trousers' in Gaelic and is romantically associated with the repeal of the proscription of the kilt by the government after the failed Jacobite Uprising of 1745. However, the dance is considerably younger, with most of the steps performed today dating from the late 19th century.

Like other dance traditions, what is called 'Highland dancing' is a hybrid form that has been constantly changing according to contemporary aesthetics and interpretations of the past. While some elements may be centuries old, other elements are much more modern. The vast majority of dances now performed were composed in the 20th century.

Highland dances are now supplemented at Highland Games and dance competitions by what are known as National dances. In Highland dancing, every dancer wears a kilt, or tartan trews. Male dancers  wear jackets, ties, and 'bonnets' (hats). Female dancers wear blouses with vests or jackets.

National dances

At Highland games, the National dances include the Scottish Lilt, the Earl of Erroll, Blue Bonnets, Hielan' Laddie, the Scotch Measure, Flora MacDonald's Fancy, Village Maid and Barracks Johnny, which illustrate the history of dancing and other aspects of Scottish culture and history. Some of the National dances were taught by dancing masters in the 19th century and show a balletic influence, while others derive from earlier traditions and were adapted to later tastes. The 'Earl of Erroll', for example, is based on an 18th-century percussive hard shoe footwork, although today's Highland dancers perform it in soft Ghillies. Some of the National dances were preserved and taught by dance masters such as D.G. MacLennan and Flora Buchan, while some were interpreted and reconstructed in the mid-20th century from notes written in Frederick Hill's 1841 manuscript.

For National dances, female dancers may wear an 'aboyne' (after the Aboyne Highland Games, where women are not allowed to wear kilts for dancing to this day, and so an outfit was devised as an alternative).

Character dances

The sailor's hornpipe was adapted from an English dance, and is now performed more frequently in Scotland, while the Irish Jig is a humorous caricature of, and tribute to, Irish step dancing (the dancer, in a red and green costume, is an interpretation of an Irish person, gesturing angrily and frowning).  If the Irish jig is danced by a woman or girl, it is about either the distressed wife scolding her husband, a woman being tormented by leprechauns, or a washerwoman chasing taunting boys (or children in general) away who have dirtied her washing - the showing of the woman's fist symbolises her wanting to beat up the children, the leprechauns, or the husband.  If it is danced by a man or boy, it is the story of Paddy's leather breeches, in which a careless washerwoman has shrunk Paddy's fine leather breeches and he is waving his shillelagh at her in anger and showing his fist, intending to hit her.

The Hornpipe mimics a sailor in her majesty's navy doing work aboard ship: hauling rope, sliding on the rollicking deck, and getting his paycheck, and has quite a lot of detail involved that portrays the character (e.g. the dancer does not touch his palms, assumed to be dirty, on his uniform). Performed in a British sailor's uniform, its name derives from the accompanying instrument, the hornpipe.  It is performed to tunes such as "Crossing the Minch" (Pipe Major Donald MacLeod) "Jackie Tar" (Traditional), and many other both contemporary and traditional tunes.

Perhaps one of the most unusual elements of character dance in modern Highland dance competitions is the inclusion of the cakewalk. The cakewalk is originally a dance performed by black slaves in the southern US imitating, in exaggerated style, the stately courtship ballroom dancing of slave owners. It is unique in competitive Highland Dance as it is the only dance always performed as a duo and is the only dance that originated outside the British Isles. Also unique is the inclusion of fanciful and often outrageous costumes upon which some of the judging of artistry is based. While costume contests do occasionally take place regarding the outfits worn for the other dances, the outfits for those dances are so carefully prescribed (differences are restricted primarily to choice of tartan, colour of jackets or sashes, and choices such as lace sleeves and velvet vests instead of velvet jackets) that costume does not play a significant role in the dance competition or vary much across dancers. In contrast, while the cakewalk may be danced in traditional Scottish attire, dancers involved in the cakewalk often attempt to come up with the most creative duo costume they can, such as Frankenstein and his bride, or Mickey and Minnie Mouse. The cakewalk is generally only danced at very large scale competitions such as national or provincial championships and is generally restricted to the top level of competitive dancers known as 'premier' (formerly 'open'.) The cakewalk is generally performed to 'Whistling Rufus', written in 1899 by Kerry Mills. The inclusion of the cakewalk in competitive Highland Dance is credited to dancer, judge and examiner James L. McKenzie who introduced the dance to Scotland from the United States.
  In 2021, the RSOBHD ruled to remove the dance from competition on the basis that it was derogatory to persons of colour.

Hebridean dances

The 'Hebridean dances' originated in the Hebrides and are now danced by Highland dancers. It is unknown when these dances originated, or who created them, but 19th century dance master Ewen MacLachlan taught them in the Western Isles during the mid-1800s.

They are Aberdonian Lassie, Blue Bonnets, Over the Water to Charlie, Tulloch Gorm, Flowers of Edinburgh, Scotch Measure (Twa'Some) and First of August. Many other dances from the Hebrides have been partially or fully lost. More relaxed than the other dances, they have also been more influenced by step-dancing.

List of dances 

The following list is by no means exhaustive.  Those marked with an asterisk ('*') are regularly observed at RSOBHD competitions.

Highland dances

National and (soft-shoe) step dances
 

Character dances

Cakewalk
Irish jig *
Sailor's hornpipe *

Dress

Each dancing association (RSOBHD, SOHDA, VSU, etc.) sets the standard of dress.  Items such as lipstick, earrings, face glitter, and the wearing of rings may be prohibited depending on the organisation.

The following is an indication of what is commonly observed.  Attire has also changed over the decades.  Ruffles around the neck and wrist-cuffs were once quite common.  Long-sleeved kilt jackets give way to short-sleeved jackets depending on the climate.  A dancer's skill level or sex may also determine the attire (under RSOBHD rules, Premier-level dancers have more prescribed items than pre-Premier dancers).

Highland dance attire

Men wear traditional Scottish hat called a Balmoral and a doublet of coloured velvet or cloth. If the jacket is in the 'Prince Charlie' style then it is to be accompanied by a shirt and bow tie with a waistcoat, cummerbund or belt. Jackets in the 'Montrose' style are to be worn with a white lace jabot and, optionally, sleeve ruffles. A kilt and matching tartan hose are worn with a sporran, or tartan trews can be worn instead of a kilt for the Seann Truibhas.

Females wear a tartan kilt with a velvet jacket, worn with a lace insert, or a sleeveless velvet vest worn over a white blouse. The jacket or vest may be black or coloured with a gold or silver braid and buttons down the front. Matching tartan hose are also worn.

National dance attire

Males wear the same dress for National dances as Highland dances, however tartan trews may be worn instead of a kilt.

Females may wear a white dress with a tartan plaid over the right shoulder. Alternatively they may wear the more popular 'aboyne'.  The aboyne dress consists of a velvet bodice over a white blouse with a tartan or tartan-like knee-length skirt and white underskirts. A tartan 'plaid' or 'plaidie'  is worn with a Scottish-themed brooch pinned to the shoulder and waist. They may also wear skin coloured tights or white socks.

Sailor's hornpipe attire

Both sexes wear the same outfit for the sailor's hornpipe in either navy or white. A v-neck jumper is worn over a square-necked white vest with bell bottom trousers. A navy or light blue collar (with three stripes) and a sailor's regulation cap are also worn.  There used to be horizontal creases in the trousers.

Irish jig attire

Irish jig shoes are black, green or red and, though they closely resemble ghillies, are hard-soled shoes with heels.

Males wear a Paddy hat, red or green muffler and tailcoat, brown or khaki breeches and a waistcoat in a contrasting colour to that of the tailcoat. A shillelagh, a kind of Irish cudgel, is carried for twirling.

Females may wear one of several combinations of red, green and white blouses, dresses, skirts and cummerbunds. Dancers also wear white underskirts and a white apron.

See also

 Clog dancing 
 Four Scottish Dances
 Dirk dance 
 Highland dress 
 Aboyne dress
 Highland games
 Irish dance
 Scottish country dance
 Step dancing 
 Scottish sword dances
 Ghillies
 Specific highland dances 
 Highland fling 
 Seann triubhas

Notes

References

Bibliography
George Emmerson, A Social History of Scottish Dance (Montreal: McGill-Queens 1972), 
Joan F. Flett and Thomas M. Flett, Traditional Dancing in Scotland (London: Routledge & Kegan Paul 1964, 1985), 
Joan F. Flett and Thomas M. Flett, Traditional Step-Dancing in Scotland (Edinburgh: Scottish Cultural Press 1996), 
Ewen McCann, William Sutherland of Thurso and Aberdeen Highland Dancer 2005. Angie MAC.G 
Highland Dancing (Textbook of the Scottish Official Board of Highland Dancing, Lindsay Publications, 1993)
Michael Newton, Warriors of the Word: The World of the Scottish Highlanders (Edinburgh: Birlinn 2009), 
Hugh A. Thurston, Scotland's Dances (Kitchener, Ontario: Teachers' Association (Canada) 1984 (reprint)),  use OCLC: 3602873

External links

Scottish Official Board of Highland Dancing (RSOBHD)
Scottish Official Highland Dance Association (SOHDA)
British Association of Teachers of Dancing (BATD)
Scottish Dance Teachers Alliance (SDTA)
United Kingdom Alliance Ltd (UKA)
Australian Board of Highland Dancing Inc.
ScotDance Canada
New Zealand Academy of Highland and National Dancing
Official Board Of Highland Dancing (South Africa) (OBHD (SA)
Federation of United States Teachers and Adjudicators 
Victorian Scottish Union
Cowal Gathering
The Hidden History of Highland Dance
toeandheel.com worldwide highland dancing information resource by Deryck & Gareth Mitchelson
New Zealand Highland Dancing History
Highland Dancer - The original Highland dancing magazine

Competitive dance
Dance
 
Highland dance
Highland dance